The 1934–35 Polska Liga Hokejowa season was the eighth season of the Polska Liga Hokejowa, the top level of ice hockey in Poland. Four teams participated in the final round, and Czarni Lwów won the championship.

Qualification
 KS Cracovia - Pogoń Lwów 4:1/1:1
 Lechia Lwów - KTH Krynica 6:1/3:1

Final Tournament

Final 
 Czarni Lwów - Lechia Lwów 4:0

External links
 Season on hockeyarchives.info

Polska Hokej Liga seasons
Polska
1934–35 in Polish ice hockey